The Naval Health Clinic, Cherry Point is a military treatment facility located aboard Marine Corps Air Station Cherry Point providing medical care to United States uniformed service members, beneficiaries and retirees living and serving in the Eastern North Carolina region. The clinic's motto "Keeping the Warfighter in the Fight" reflects its commitment to ensuring the base's tenet units assigned to the 2nd Marine Aircraft Wing and Fleet Readiness Center East attain and sustain the highest state of medical readiness.

Leadership 
Navy Captain Elizabeth M. Adriano assumed command of Naval Health Clinic Cherry Point in Spring, 2021.  She is scheduled to relinquish command of the facility in early Summer, 2023.

History

Early History: 1941-1968 
On July 9, 1941, Congress authorized the establishment of what would become Marine Corps Air Station Cherry Point, requiring the presence of medical facility and Navy Medicine personnel to provide day-to-day sick call.  The first Navy Medical Officer assigned to the dispensary was Lt. Cmdr. Everette J. Olnick.  Olnick's primary mission was to control the spread of Malaria since the newly established airfield was situated among eastern Carolina swampland infested with mosquitos.  The scope and scale of the dispensary continued to grow as the airfield's mission took on increased importance during the nation's involvement in World War II.

Post World War II: 1968-2007
The facility was formally commissioned as Naval Hospital Cherry Point on July 1, 1968, with oversight held by the Navy's Bureau of Medicine and Surgery. Twenty-nine years later, construction began on a state-of-the-art facility with a total of 201,806 sq. feet at a cost of approximately $34 million designed by Rogers, Lovelock, and Fitz, Inc.  The new facility, at its current location on Beaufort Road, was dedicated October 1, 1994 in the memory of Posthumous Medal of Honor recipient Pharmacist's Mate Second Class William D. Halyburton and became fully functional October 3, 1994.

Naval Health Clinic Cherry Point honors the memory of Pharmacist's Mate 2nd Class William David Halyburton, Jr., a Medal of Honor Recipient who posthumously received the Medal of Honor for his actions May 10, 1945 on the Island of Okinawa while assigned to the 2nd Battalion, 5th Marine Regiment, 1st Marine Division  Halyburton's Medal of Honor was officially donated to the clinic in May, 2016, where it is currently on display on the 1st floor. Naval Hospital Cherry Point realigned to Naval Health Clinic Cherry Point on October 1, 2007, as a result of recommendations made by Base Realignment and Closure. The realignment refocused the clinic's scope of care for service members, beneficiaries and retirees while divesting its ability to deliver babies, provide emergency services and maintain overnight patients.

Establishment of the Coastal North Carolina Marketplace: 2021
On August 25, 2021, Naval Health Clinic Cherry Point joined in partnership with Naval Medical Center Camp Lejeune to form the Coastal North Carolina Market under the Defense Health Agency.  This partnership streamlines patient care between the two medical facilities while sharing resources.  The market is estimated to service a population of approximately 170,000 eligible beneficiaries.

The Joint Commission Accreditation Survey: 2022 
On July 11–13, Naval Health Clinic Cherry Point underwent an accreditation visit by The Joint Commission.  Several departments within the clinic received commendations, to include medicine management, behavioral health and facilities with no major deficiencies found by the inspectors.

Navy Medicine Readiness Training Command Cherry Point 
Naval Health Clinic Cherry Point also serves as Navy Medicine Readiness Training Command Cherry Point with the mission to train and provide Sailors ready to deploy in support of operations inside the United States and abroad.

Coastal North Carolina Marketplace  
Naval Health Clinic Cherry Point is a component of the Coastal Carolina Marketplace alongside Naval Medical Center Camp Lejeune.  Partnership between the two facilities provides patients with broader access to medical care within the MCAS Cherry Point & Camp Lejeune regions.

Patient Care and Current Operations 
Naval Health Clinic Cherry Point's current operating hours are from 07:30 A.M. to 4:00 P.M. EST.  The clinic offers a variety of out-patient medical services, to include physical therapy, behavioral health, family medicine and pharmacy. In mid-2022, the Cherry Point Women's Health Clinic opened in the facility's Medical Homeport Red Team area.  The walk-in clinic operates every Tuesday from 8AM to 12 PM and offers a variety of contraceptives with no appointment necessary.

References 

Hospitals in North Carolina
Medical installations of the United States Navy
Military hospitals in the United States
Military installations in North Carolina